Ashland Radar Station was a United States Air Force station located in Ashland, Maine operational from around 1975 to 1990.

History
The station was constructed in August of 1975 along route "IR-800", which was designated in 1981. Detachment 7 moved southwest to the new Ashland Radar Station south of Ashland, Maine. The Ashland Strategic Training Range eventually included an AN/MPS-T1 and Multiple Threat Emitter System (MUTES) and in 1985, Det 7 was awarded the Combat Skyspot trophy. It was closed in 1994 at the end of the Cold War.

References

1980 establishments in Maine
1990 disestablishments in Maine
Formerly Used Defense Sites
Buildings and structures in Aroostook County, Maine
Military installations in Maine
Strategic Air Command radar stations
United States automatic tracking radar stations
Loring Air Force Base
Military installations established in 1980
Military installations closed in 1990